Alice Tumler (born 11 November 1978) is an Austrian television presenter.

Early life and education
Tumler was born in Innsbruck and is the daughter of an Austrian father with Slovenian-Italian descent and a French mother from the island of Martinique. At the age of 19, she moved to London, where she studied journalism, media and sociology, and later moved to Paris where she participated in theater courses at the Cours Florent.

Career
Tumler's career as a television presenter began in 2004 with French music channel TraceTV. She has also worked for the Franco-German TV network, Arte and French national channel France 3.

Since 2013, she has hosted the ORF talent show Die große Chance alongside Andi Knoll. In May 2015, she jointly hosted the Eurovision Song Contest 2015 with Mirjam Weichselbraun and Arabella Kiesbauer at the Wiener Stadthalle in Vienna.

In October 2015, Governor Günther Platter named her Tyrolean of the Year.

Personal life
Tumler speaks four languages fluently, German, English, French and Italian and is proficient in Spanish and Portuguese. She has a daughter.

References

External links

 Alice Tumler at ORF
 

Living people
1978 births
Austrian television presenters
Austrian women television presenters
Mass media people from Innsbruck
ORF (broadcaster) people
Cours Florent alumni
Austrian people of Slovenian descent
Austrian people of Italian descent
Austrian people of French descent
Austrian people of Martiniquais descent